DWIN may refer to:

 DWIN-AM, an AM radio station broadcasting in Dagupan, branded as Radyo Agila
 DWIN-FM, an FM radio station broadcasting in Roxas, branded as Win FM